Jules Verne (1828–1905) was a French novelist, poet, and playwright. Most famous for his novel sequence, the Voyages Extraordinaires, Verne also wrote assorted short stories, plays, miscellaneous novels, essays, and poetry. His works are notable for their profound influence on science fiction and on surrealism, their innovative use of modernist literary techniques such as self-reflexivity, and their complex combination of positivist and romantic ideologies.

Unless otherwise referenced, the information presented here is derived from the research of Volker Dehs, Jean-Michel Margot, Zvi Har’El, and William Butcher.

Voyages Extraordinaires

Three publication dates for each book are given because, in the system developed by Pierre-Jules Hetzel for the Voyages Extraordinaires, each of Verne's novels was published successively in several different formats. This resulted in several distinct editions of each texts, as follows. 
 Serial (known as éditions pré-originales, pre-original editions): Serialization in a periodical, usually Hetzel's own biweekly Magasin d'Éducation et de récréation ("Magazine of Education and Recreation", founded 1864). The serialized installments were illustrated by artists on Hetzel's staff, such as Édouard Riou, Léon Benett, and George Roux.
 In-18 (éditions originales, original editions): complete unillustrated texts published in book form at in-18 (18mo) size. (Similar versions in the slightly larger 12mo size, with illustrations taken from the serialization, are also considered éditions originales.) This edition is almost always the first book-format printing; the one exception is Claudius Bombarnac, which was first published in a grand-in-8º edition.
 In-8 (cartonnages dorés et colorés, gilded and colored bindings): Complete editions of the text, published in grand in-8º ("large octavo") book form with a lavishly decorated cover. These deluxe editions, designed for Christmas and New Year's markets, include most or all of the illustrations from the serializations.

Published in Verne's lifetime

Posthumous additions

The posthumously published volumes in the Voyages Extraordinaires were extensively altered, and in some cases entirely written, by Verne's son Michel.

Other novels

Published in Verne's lifetime
 L'Épave du "Cynthia" (The Waif of the "Cynthia", 1885, with André Laurie)

Posthumously published
 Un Pretre en 1835 (A Priest in 1835, first published 2016, unfinished)
 Voyage en Angleterre et en Ecosse (Backwards to Britain, 1860, first published 1989)
 Paris au XXe siècle (Paris in the Twentieth Century, 1863, first published 1994)

Short stories

Published in Verne's lifetime
"Un drame au Mexique" ("A Drama in Mexico," originally published as "Les premiers navires de la marine mexicaine," 1851)
"Un drame dans les airs" ("A Drama in the Air," originally published as "Un voyage en ballon," 1851)
"Martin Paz" ("Martin Paz," 1852)
"Maître Zacharius" ("Master Zacharius," 1854)
"Un hivernage dans les glaces" ("A Winter Amid the Ice," 1855)
"Le Comte de Chanteleine" ("The Count of Chanteleine", 1864)
"Les Forceurs de blocus" ("The Blockade Runners", 1871)
"Une fantaisie du Docteur Ox" ("Dr. Ox's Experiment," 1872)
"Une ville idéale" ("An Ideal Town," 1875)
"Les révoltés de la Bounty ("The Mutineers of the Bounty," 1879, with Gabriel Marcel)
"Dix heures en chasse" ("Ten Hours Hunting," 1881)
"Frritt-Flacc" ("Frritt-Flacc," 1884)
"Gil Braltar" ("Gil Braltar," 1887)
"La Journée d’un journaliste américain en 2890" (1891, based on the 1889 short story "In the Year 2889" by Michel Verne)
"Aventures de la famille Raton" ("Adventures of the Rat Family," 1891)
"Monsieur Ré-Dièze et Mademoiselle Mi-Bémol" ("Mr. Re Sharp and Miss Mi Flat," 1893)

Posthumously published
"Pierre-Jean" ("Pierre-Jean"; published by Michel Verne in 1910 in heavily altered form as "La destinée de Jean Morénas")
"Le Mariage de M. Anselme des Tilleuls" ("The Marriage of Mr. Anselme des Tilleuls")
"San Carlos" ("San Carlos")
"Le Humbug", ("The Humbug", 1910)
"Edom" ("Edom," with Michel Verne; published by Michel Verne in 1910 in heavily altered form as L'Éternel Adam)

Nonfiction books
 Géographie illustrée de la France et de ses colonies (Illustrated Geography of France and its Colonies, 1866–68, with Théophile Lavallée)
 Découverte de la Terre: Histoire générale des grands voyages et des grands voyageurs (Discovery of the Earth, 1870–80, with Gabriel Marcel)
 Grands Navigateurs du XVIIIe siècle (Great Navigators of the Eighteenth Century)
 Les voyageurs du XIXe siècle

Essays
 "Portraits d'artistes. XVIII" ("Portraits of Artists: XVIII," 1857)
 "Salon de 1857" ("Salon of 1857," series of seven articles, 1857)
 "A propos du Géant" ("About the Géant," 1863)
 "Edgar Poe et ses œuvres" ("Edgar Allan Poe and his Works," 1864)
 "Les méridiens et le calendrier" ("The Meridians and the Calendar," 1873)
 "24 minutes en ballon" ("24 Minutes in a Balloon," 1873)
 "Note pour l’affaire J. Verne contre Pont Jest" ("Note for the case J. Verne v. Pont Jest", 1876)
 "Souvenirs d’enfance et de jeunesse" ("Memories of Childhood and Youth," 1890)

Plays
 Les Pailles rompues (The Broken Straws, 1850)
 Monna Lisa (Mona Lisa, 1852)
 Le Colin-Maillard (Blind Man's Buff, 1853, with Michel Carré and Aristide Hignard)
 Un Fils adoptif (The Adoptive Son, 1853, with Charles Wallut)
 Les Compagnons de la Marjolaine (Knights of the Daffodil, 1855, with Carré and Hignard)
 Monsieur de Chimpanzé (Mr. Chimpanzee, 1858, with Carré and Hignard)
 L’Auberge des Ardennes (The Inn in the Ardennes, 1860, with Carré and Hignard)
 Onze jours de siège (Eleven Days' Siege, 1861, with Wallut and Victorien Sardou)
 Un neveu d’Amérique (A Nephew from America, 1873, with Wallut and Édouard Cadol)
 Le Tour du monde en 80 jours (Around the World in 80 Days, 1874, with Adolphe d'Ennery)
 Les Enfants du capitaine Grant (The Children of Captain Grant, 1878, with d'Ennery)
 Michel Strogoff (Michael Strogoff, 1880, with d'Ennery)
 Voyage à travers l'impossible (Journey Through the Impossible, 1882)
 Kéraban-le-têtu (Kéraban the Pigheaded, 1883)
 Mathias Sandorf (Mathias Sandorf, 1887, with William Busnach)

Notes

References

Citations

External links
The Complete Jules Verne Bibliographywith notes and research by leading Verne scholars 

Verne, Jules

Bibliographies of French writers